During the 2010–11 Spanish football season, RCD Mallorca competed in La Liga.

Season summary
Danish coach Michael Laudrup was appointed as head coach. Despite the club's financial difficulties, the club avoided relegation by one point.

Kit
Mallorca's kits were manufactured by Italian sportswear company Macron and sponsored by Austrian online gambling company bet-at-home.com.

First-team squad
Squad at end of season

Left club during season

Competitions

La Liga

League table

References

Notes

RCD Mallorca seasons
RCD Mallorca